The 2009–10 Tercera División was the fourth tier of football in Spain. Play started on 29 August 2009 and ended on 20 June 2010 with the promotion play-off finals.

Overview
There were 362 clubs competing in  Tercera División (Third division) in the 2009–10 season, divided into 18 regional groups, accommodating between 20 and 22 clubs.

The following clubs finished as champions of their respective groups

Grupo I (Galicia) - Deportivo B
Grupo II (Asturias) - Caudal
Grupo III (Cantabria) - Noja
Grupo IV (País Vasco) - Real Sociedad B
Grupo V (Cataluña) - L'Hospitalet
Grupo VI (Comunidad Valenciana) - Gandía
Grupo VII (Comunidad de Madrid) - Rayo B
Grupo VIII (Castilla & León) - Burgos
Grupo IX (Andalucía Oriental (Almería, Granada, Jaén & Málaga) & Melilla) - At. Mancha Real
Grupo X (Andalucía Occidental (Cádiz, Córdoba, Huelva & Sevilla) & Ceuta) - Alcalá
Grupo XI (Islas Baleares) - Atlético Baleares
Grupo XII (Canarias) - Corralejo
Grupo XIII (Región de Murcia) - Jumilla
Grupo XIV (Extremadura) - Badajoz
Grupo XV (Navarra) - Tudelano
Grupo XVI (La Rioja) - Oyonesa
Grupo XVII (Aragón) - Teruel
Grupo XVIII (Castilla-La Mancha) - La Roda

The 18 group champion clubs participated in the Group winners promotion play-off and the losers from these 9 play-off ties then proceeded to the Non-champions promotion play-off with clubs finishing second third and fourth.

League standings

Group I - Galicia

Group II - Asturias

Group III - Cantabria

Group IV - Basque Country

Group V - Catalonia

Group VI - Valencian Community

Group VII - Community of Madrid

Group VIII - Castilla and León

Group IX - Eastern Andalusia and Melilla

Group X - Western Andalusia and Ceuta

Group XI - Balearic Islands

Group XII - Canary Islands

Group XIII - Region of Murcia

Group XIV - Extremadura

Group XV - Navarra

Group XVI - La Rioja

Group XVII - Aragón

Group XVIII - Castilla-La Mancha

Promotion play-offs

Group winners promotion play-off 
Promoted to Segunda División B: Deportivo B, Gandía, Atlético Baleares, Alcalá, Real Sociedad B, Teruel, Badajoz, Caudal and Rayo B.

Non-champions promotion play-off 
Promoted to Segunda División B: Getafe B, Yeclano, Coruxo, Santboià, La Muela, Alzira, Peña Sport, Extremadura and L'Hospitalet.

Notes

External links
 Real Federación Española de Fútbol
Futbolme.com
Lapreferente.com

 
Tercera División seasons
4
Spanish